Kewin may refer to:
Kewin Orellana (born 1992), Swiss hockey player
Kewin (footballer) (born 1995), Brazilian footballer

See also
Kevin